Superclass may refer to:
 Superclass (book), a book about global governance by David Rothkopf and The Superclass List
 Superclass (biology), a taxonomic rank intermediate between subphylum and class
 Superclass (computer science), a class from which other classes are derived

See also 
 Subclass (disambiguation)